Luan Sérgio Nascimento Dias de Almeida (born 18 August 1994), known as Luan Sérgio, is a Brazilian football player who plays for C.D.C. Montalegre.

Club career
He made his professional debut in the Campeonato Carioca for Bangu on 14 February 2016 in a game against Bonsucesso.

References

1994 births
Living people
Footballers from Rio de Janeiro (city)
Brazilian footballers
Brazilian expatriate footballers
Bangu Atlético Clube players
Association football midfielders
Brazilian expatriate sportspeople in Portugal
Expatriate footballers in Portugal
C.D.C. Montalegre players